Idiopathic interstitial pneumonia (IIP), or noninfectious pneumonia are a class of diffuse lung diseases. These diseases typically affect the pulmonary interstitium, although some also have a component affecting the airways (for instance, cryptogenic organizing pneumonitis). There are seven recognized distinct subtypes of IIP.

Diagnosis
Classification can be complex, and the combined efforts of clinicians, radiologists, and pathologists can help in the generation of a more specific diagnosis.

Idiopathic interstitial pneumonia can be subclassified based on histologic appearance into the following patterns:

Usual interstitial pneumonia is the most common type.

Development
Table 1: Development of the (histologic) idiopathic interstitial pneumonia classification

UIP=usual interstitial pneumonia; DAD=diffuse alveolar damage; NSIP=non-specific interstitial pneumonia; DIP=desquamative interstitial pneumonia; RB=respiratory bronchiolitis; BIP=bronchiolitis obliterans interstitial pneumonia; OP=organizing pneumonia; LIP=lymphoid interstitial pneumonia; LPD=lymphoproliferative disease (not considered a diffuse lung disease); GIP=giant cell interstitial pneumonia; HMF=heavy metal fibrosis, no longer grouped with diffuse lung disease

Lymphoid interstitial pneumonia was originally included in this category, then excluded, then included again.

References

External links 

Pneumonia
Idiopathic diseases